In camera is a legal term meaning "in private".

In camera may also refer to:
In Camera (Arthur & Yu album)
In Camera (Peter Hammill album)
In Camera (band), a London-based post-punk band
In Camera, a duo project of the musicians Christoph Heemann and Timo Van Luyck
No Exit, Jean-Paul Sartre's existentialist play, as its original title Huis Clos is the French legal term for "in camera"
In-camera effects or in-camera editing in film and video production